In linguistics, an affix is a morpheme that is attached to a word stem to form a new word or word form. Affixes may be derivational, like English -ness and pre-, or inflectional, like English plural -s and past tense -ed. They are bound morphemes by definition; prefixes and suffixes may be separable affixes. Affixation is the linguistic process that speakers use to form different words by adding morphemes at the beginning (prefixation), the middle (infixation) or the end (suffixation) of words.

Positional categories of affixes

Prefix and suffix may be subsumed under the term adfix, in contrast to infix.

When marking text for interlinear glossing, as in the third column in the chart above, simple affixes such as prefixes and suffixes are separated from the stem with hyphens. Affixes which disrupt the stem, or which themselves are discontinuous, are often marked off with angle brackets. Reduplication is often shown with a tilde. Affixes which cannot be segmented are marked with a back slash.

Lexical affixes
Lexical affixes (or semantic affixes) are bound elements that appear as affixes, but function as incorporated nouns within verbs and as elements of nouns. In other words, they are similar to word roots/stems in function but similar to affixes in form. Although similar to incorporated nouns, lexical affixes differ in that they never occur as freestanding nouns, i.e. they always appear as affixes.

Lexical affixes are relatively rare. The Wakashan, Salishan, and Chimakuan languages all have lexical suffixes — the presence of these is an areal feature of the Pacific Northwest of North America.

The lexical suffixes of these languages often show little to no resemblance to free nouns with similar meanings. Compare the lexical suffixes and free nouns of Northern Straits Saanich written in the Saanich orthography and in Americanist notation:

Lexical suffixes, when compared with free nouns, often have a more generic or general meaning. For instance, one of these languages may have a lexical suffix that means water in a general sense, but it may not have any noun equivalent referring to water in general and instead have several nouns with a more specific meaning (such "saltwater", "whitewater", etc.). In other cases, the lexical suffixes have become grammaticalized to various degrees.

Some linguists have claimed that these lexical suffixes provide only adverbial or adjectival notions to verbs. Other linguists disagree arguing that they may additionally be syntactic arguments just as free nouns are and, thus, equating lexical suffixes with incorporated nouns. Gerdts (2003) gives examples of lexical suffixes in the Halkomelem language (the word order here is verb–subject–object):

{| class="IPA wikitable"
|- style="line-height: 1.0em; font-size: 75%"
|
|
| style="background: #bbbbff" | VERB
| style="background: #ffebad" | SUBJ
| style="background: #ffbbbb" | OBJ
|-
| (1)
| niʔ
| šak’ʷ-ət-əs
| łə słeniʔ
| łə qeq
|-
|
| colspan="4" | "the woman washed the baby"
|- style="line-height: 1.0em; font-size: 75%"
| bgcolor=white colspan=5| 
|- style="line-height: 1.0em; font-size: 75%"
|
|
| style="background: #bbbbff" | VERB+LEX.SUFF
| style="background: #ffebad" | SUBJ
|
|-
| (2)
| niʔ
| šk’ʷ-əyəł
| łə słeniʔ
|
|-
|
| colspan="4" | "the woman baby-washed"
|}

In sentence (1), the verb "wash" is šak’ʷətəs where šak’ʷ- is the root and -ət and -əs are inflectional suffixes. The subject "the woman" is łə słeniʔ and the object "the baby" is łə qeq. In this sentence, "the baby" is a free noun. (The niʔ here is an auxiliary, which can be ignored for explanatory purposes.)

In sentence (2), "baby" does not appear as a free noun. Instead it appears as the lexical suffix -əyəł which is affixed to the verb root šk’ʷ- (which has changed slightly in pronunciation, but this can also be ignored here). Note how the lexical suffix is neither "the baby" (definite) nor "a baby" (indefinite); such referential changes are routine with incorporated nouns.

Orthographic affixes
In orthography, the terms for affixes may be used for the smaller elements of conjunct characters. For example, Maya glyphs are generally compounds of a main sign and smaller affixes joined at its margins. These are called prefixes, superfixes, postfixes, and subfixes according to their position to the left, on top, to the right, or at the bottom of the main glyph. A small glyph placed inside another is called an infix. Similar terminology is found with the conjunct consonants of the Indic alphabets. For example, the Tibetan alphabet utilizes prefix, suffix, superfix, and subfix consonant letters.

See also

 Agglutination
 Augmentative
 Binary prefix
 Clitic
 Combining form
 Concatenation
 Diminutive
 English prefixes
 Family name affixes
 Internet-related prefixes
 Marker (linguistics)
 Morphological derivation
 Separable affix
 SI prefix
 Stemming - affix removal using computer software
 Unpaired word
 Word formation

References

Bibliography
 
 Montler, Timothy. (1986). An outline of the morphology and phonology of Saanich, North Straits Salish. Occasional Papers in Linguistics (No. 4). Missoula, MT: University of Montana Linguistics Laboratory.
 Montler, Timothy. (1991). Saanich, North Straits Salish classified word list. Canadian Ethnology service paper (No. 119); Mercury series. Hull, Quebec: Canadian Museum of Civilization.

External links

Comprehensive and searchable affix dictionary reference

 
Lexical units
Linguistics terminology